Australia was represented by six athletes in the first Paralympic Paracanoeing event at the 2016 Rio Paralympics.

It was their Paralympic debut for all members of the team.

Medal Tally

Summer Paralympic Games

2016 Rio

Australia was represented by: 

Men - Colin Sieders (d), Curtis McGrath (d), Dylan Littlehales (d)
Women -  Jocelyn Neumueller (d), Susan Seipel (d), Amanda Reynolds (d) 
Coaches - Andrea King  (Head), Guy Power  
Officials - Team Leader - Christine Bain, Physiotherapist - Melissa Nolan  

Australia won three medals with Curtis McGrath taking gold in Men's KL2, Amanda Reynolds taking silver in the Women's KL3 and Susan Seipel taking bronze in the Women's KL2.

Detailed Australian Results

2020 Tokyo

Australia was represented by: 
Men -  Curtis McGrath, Dylan Littlehales
Women- Susan Seipel, Amanda Reynolds 
Coaches -Shaun Caven, Jake Michael 
Officials - Physiotherapist - Kate O'Connell    

Australia won three medals with Curtis McGrath taking gold in Men's KL2 and VL3 and Susan Seipel taking silver in the Women's VL3.

Detailed Australian Results

References

See also 
 Paracanoe at the Summer Paralympics
 Australia at the Paralympics

Australian Paralympic teams
 Canoeing in Australia